Demontage is an original novel written by Justin Richards and based on the long-running British science fiction television series Doctor Who. It features the Eighth Doctor, Sam and Fitz.

Summary
The Vega Station is a neutral space for two warring factions; a peaceful shopping and cultural center for many. Or so it seems. When the Doctor, Sam and Fitz turn up, each get sucked into various intrigues that threaten the peace. Not only that, monsters roam the corridor and a hitman is setting up his kill.

External links
The Cloister Library - Demontage

Reviews
The Whoniverse's review on Demontage

1999 British novels
1999 science fiction novels
Eighth Doctor Adventures
Novels by Justin Richards